The MassMutual Center (formerly Springfield Civic Center) is a multi-purpose arena and convention center complex located in downtown Springfield, Massachusetts, in the city's Metro Center. The arena opened in 1972 and the convention center opened in 2005. It serves as a venue for meetings, conventions, exhibitions, sporting and entertainment events.

Previously owned and operated by the City of Springfield and various management groups until 1997, the city transferred ownership of the facility to the Massachusetts Legislature. Shortly after, ownership was given to the Massachusetts Convention Center Authority (MCCA) who in turn began working on plans to renovate and expand the facility. The two-year project, which began in 2003, included renovations to the 8,000-seat arena and the addition of a convention center. Its unique design allows for 3 to 4 concurrent events or one large event.

MGM Springfield began operating the venue on behalf of the MCCA in July 2017 in advance of its casino/hotel/retail development opening the next year.

In 2005, the venue was renamed when Massachusetts Mutual Life Insurance Company entered into a 15-year naming rights agreement for the arena and convention center. The name change took place on September 29, 2005.

The venue is home to the Springfield Thunderbirds of the American Hockey League and American International Yellow Jackets who compete in NCAA Men's Division I Ice Hockey.

Renovations

Arena
In the fall of 2003, the renovation project was publicly announced and demolition of the bank sitting next to the building, along with the facility's plaza and exhibit hall began. In the fall of 2005, the $71 million renovation project was completed. The renovation included a new arena floor with new pipelines for the ice rink and new chillers installed. Upgrades to the buildings electrical system as well as the heating and air conditioning system with a new dehumidification system were also installed. Audio and Video upgrades were made with a new four-sided center hung scoreboard with video display and a new sound system. The project also included a new seating arrangement with 6,455 permanent seats and 222 club seats. New amenities to the arena include a bar and lounge, clubroom, an executive suite, new larger restrooms, and 11 newly refurbished concession stands. The main entrance was relocated from Main Street to Bruce Landon Way where a new box office and lobby were added. The arena was still operational during the two-year project which was funded by city and state tax payers and other state funds.

The main entrance for the arena is located on Bruce Landon Way. The arena has 3 levels:
Event Level: Box Office, Administrative Offices, Thunderbirds Office and Team Store.
Concourse Level: Lower and Upper Bowl Seating, Center Grille Restaurant, Breakaway Bar & Lounge.
Upper Level: Broadcast booths, The Executive Perch, VIP suites

In the summer of 2015 the MCCA approved a multimillion-dollar technology upgrade to the venue. This project consisted of a new  4 sided center hung LED video board that replaced the existing scoreboard in the arena as well as the replacement of the arena lighting system to new LED lighting.

Convention Center
With renovations to the existing arena, a new convention center was added. With , it is the largest convention center in Western Massachusetts. It connects both the convention center and arena to add an additional  of floor space. Additionally, the pre-function space overlooks the city skyline, including a viewing area known as the glass alcove which gives panoramic views of downtown. The convention center is able to host galas, weddings, consumer and trade shows, concerts, conventions, conferences, and many other functions of various sizes.

The main entrance for the convention center is located on Main Street and Bruce Landon Way. There are 2 levels:
Event Level: Meeting Rooms 1–5, Exhibition Halls A & B
Upper Level: Ballrooms A, B, and C, Glass Alcove

History

The arena hosted the Hartford Whalers of the National Hockey League, while the Hartford Civic Center was undergoing renovations, because of a 1978 roof collapse.

The arena hosted World Wrestling Federation's Saturday Night's Main Event XVI (the first episode following Wrestlemania IV, taped on April 22, 1988, aired on April 30). It also hosted the 19th WWF In Your House pay-per-view in 1997. The center has also hosted WWE Monday Night RAW and two WWE SmackDown! shows; the first one was on October 26, 1999, aired for that Thursday, and the second was on December 13, 2005, aired for that Friday. The center was also where The Mountie (Jacques Rougeau) defeated Bret "Hitman" Hart for the WWF Intercontinental Championship on January 17, 1992. He would lose the title two days later to Rowdy Roddy Piper at the Knickerbocker Arena in Albany, New York at the Royal Rumble.

The building has hosted an American Hockey League franchise, since it opened in 1972. Between the 1972–73 AHL season and 1993–94 AHL season, the building hosted the Springfield Indians franchise. Since 1994, the center was the home of the Springfield Falcons. The Falcons won the Northeast Division Championship in the 2012–13 and 2013–14 seasons while serving as the AHL affiliate of the Columbus Blue Jackets. The team was sold in May 2016 to the Arizona Coyotes and relocated to Tucson, Arizona. The Falcons were immediately replaced with the Springfield Thunderbirds for the 2016–17 season.

The building, located in the "Birthplace of Basketball", has also hosted numerous NCAA Men's Division II Basketball Championships, first in 1977, then from 1980 to 1994, and finally 2006 through 2011. The tournament moved to the Kentucky suburbs of Cincinnati in 2012 and 2013. It also hosted the first six NCAA Women's Division II Basketball Championships from 1982 to 1987.

The UMass Minutemen basketball team, formerly under head coach and Springfield native Derek Kellogg, has used the building for a home game since 2010. In 2011, the Basketball Hall of Fame created the Holiday Showcase which feature the UMass Minutemen basketball team. Brigham Young University visited the UMass Minutemen during the 2013 showcase with a sold-out crowd of 7,331.

The Springfield Armor of the NBA D-League joined the building's roster of home tenants in the fall of 2009. The franchise was purchased by the HWS Group in early 2009, and was quickly moved to Springfield for the start of the 2009–2010 season. It was affiliated with the NBA's New York Knicks, the Philadelphia 76ers, and the New Jersey Nets for two years. The New Jersey Nets, now known as the Brooklyn Nets as of 2012, became the sole affiliate of the Armor in the start of the 2011–2012 season. The Armor received their first Eastern Division Championship during the 2011–2012 season under its new head coach Bob MacKinnon. They won their final home game on March 21, 2014, in front of a sold-out crowd of 7,111.

NHL games

International hockey

Notable events
The MassMutual Center has hosted numerous events over the years ranging from professional and college sporting events, concert and comedy tours, ice skating and family shows, commencement ceremonies, and other functions both private and public. On April 6, 1986, the KISS "Asylum" tour concert overloaded the power system and the concert was halted after the first song. The band exited the stage, but returned 30–40 minutes later and resumed the show without incident.

Sports
 The National Collegiate Athletic Associations (NCAA) men's college basketball Division I ECAC New England Region tournament organized by the Eastern College Athletic Conference (ECAC) in 1975 and 1976.
NCAA Division II Men's Basketball Championships (1980–1994, 2006–2011)
Freestyle Motorcross 2008
North American Grappling Association East Coast Championship (2010 and 2011)
Naismith Memorial Basketball Hall of Fame Tip-Off Classic 2010
Metro Atlantic Athletic Conference Men's and Women's Basketball Championships (2012–2014)
1996 edition of the Skate America figure skating competition
1996 World Junior Ice Hockey Championships Group Stage games
2019 AHL All-Star Game

Concerts
Queen – News of the World Tour 1977
Kansas – Point of Know Return Tour 1977
Bon Jovi – Slippery When Wet Tour 1987
Yes – 90125 1984
Van Halen – World Vacation Tour 1979
The Who – The Who By Numbers Tour 1975
Elvis Presley in Concert 1975 and 1976
Bob Dylan – Rolling Thunder Revue Tour 1975
Bruce Springsteen – Darkness on the Edge Tour 1978
KISS – Destroyer Tour 1976, Alive II Tour 1978, Dynasty Tour 1979, Asylum Tour 1986, and Alive/Worldwide Tour 1997
Grateful Dead in Concert 1972, 1973, 1974, 1977, 1978, January and October in 1979, 1980, and 1985.
Earth, Wind & Fire in Concert 1978
The Jacksons – Destiny Tour 1979
Black Sabbath – Born Again Tour 1984 (Last show with Deep Purple's Ian Gillan on vocals and rebroadcast on the King Biscuit Flower Hour FM broadcast.)
AC/DC- 'Blow Up Your Video' Tour 1988
Anthrax, Exodus and Helloween – Headbangers Ball Tour 1989
Aerosmith – Pump Tour 1989 and 1990 featuring Skid Row
Nirvana in Concert 1993
Pantera- Far Beyond Touring the World 1994
Mötley Crüe – Carnival of Sins Tour 2006
Celtic Woman – A New Journey Tour 2007 and Voices of Angels World Tour 2017
Martina McBride – Waking Up Laughing Tour 2007
Sugarland – CMT on Tour 2007 featuring Little Big Town and Jake Owen
Blue Man Group – How to Be a Megastar Tour 2008
Three Days Grace – Life Starts Now Tour 2010 featuring Chevelle and Adelitas Way
Avenged Sevenfold – Welcome to the Family Tour 2011 featuring Three Days Grace and Bullet for My Valentine
Wisin y Yandel – Los Vaqueros:El Regreso Tour 2011
Mid-West Rock and Roll Express Tour 2013 featuring Styx, REO Speedwagon, and Ted Nugent
Shinedown in Concert 2013 featuring Bush and Airbourne
Pitbull – Global Warming Tour 2013
Justin Moore – Off the Beaten Path Tour 2014 featuring Josh Thompson and Randy Houser
Alan Jackson – Keepin' It Country Tour 2015 featuring Jon Pardi and Brandy Clark
Stevie Wonder – The Stevie Wonder Song Party: A Celebration of Life, Love & Music Tour 2018
Cher – Here We Go Again Tour 2019 featuring Nile Rogers and Chic
Aerosmith – Deuces Are Wild East Coast Tour 2019

Other events
WWE – In Your House Degeneration X PPV 1997
Larry the Cable Guy – 2008 Tour
Louis C.K. – 2016 Tour
Amy Schumer – 2016 Tour
Bill Burr – 2018 Tour
George Lopez, Cedric 'the Entertainer', Eddie Griffin, and D.L. Hugley – The Comedy Get Down Tour 2018
Basketball Hall of Fame Enshrinement Class of 2021
John Mulaney – 2022 From Scratch Tour

Conventions and conferences
Daughters of the Nile 2007 Convention
Market America Northeast Convention 2010–2012
Brewery Collectibles Club of America CANvention 2012
Bay Path University Women's Leadership Conference
64th National Square Dance 2015 Convention
Democratic State Convention 2019
Red Sox Winter Weekend 2020
Bernie Sanders rally the weekend ahead of Massachusetts Democratic Primary 2020

References

External links

 
 Massachusetts Convention Center Authority Website

1972 establishments in Massachusetts
College basketball venues in the United States
Convention centers in Massachusetts
Defunct National Hockey League venues
Defunct NBA G League venues
American Hockey League venues
Indoor ice hockey venues in the United States
Sports venues in Springfield, Massachusetts
Springfield Armor
Springfield Falcons
Springfield Indians
Springfield Thunderbirds
Sports venues completed in 1972
Basketball venues in Massachusetts
Indoor ice hockey venues in Massachusetts
College ice hockey venues in the United States
Hartford Whalers